Isabella was launched in 1773 in America, possibly under another name. She appeared in United Kingdom sources in 1802 and between 1802 and 1810 she made nine annual voyages as a whaler in the northern whale fishery (Davis Strait (DS) and Greenland (Gr)). She was last listed in 1813 with data unchanged since 1810.

Career
Isabella first appeared in the Register of Shipping (RS) in 1804. By then she had been sailing out of Newcastle as a whaler for some time.

In 1805 one of the whales that Isabella had killed was one of the largest whales ever caught.

When Isabella returned home to Newcastle in 1808 one of her crewmen lost his arm. The arm was shot off when he fired a cannon to signal her arrival.<ref>"Marine Intelligence. Hull Packet (Hull, England), 16 August 1808, Issue 1127.</ref>

On 17 December 1808  towed Isabella, of Newcastle, Lambert, master, into Harwich. Isabella had been sailing from Calmar to Hull when she became distressed. she had five feet of water in her hold, part of her cargo and guns had been thrown overboard, and her foreyard and her sails from the foreyard had been cut down. Her crew had been about to take to her boats and abandon her when Briseis came on the scene.

FateIsabella was last listed in the Register of Shipping'' in 1813, with data unchanged since 1810.

Citations

1773 ships
Age of Sail merchant ships of England
Whaling ships
Maritime incidents in 1809